This is a list of aircraft used by the Spanish Republican Air Force during the Spanish Civil War.

Introduction

The Second Spanish Republic was proclaimed in 1931 and very soon the republican authorities set up to reform an antiquated military structure that was a financial burden for the Spanish state following the Great Depression.
The Spanish Republican Air Force inherited a great number of airplanes from the monarchy, most of which had been used in the Spanish Campaigns in Northern Africa during general Primo de Rivera's dictatorship in the 1920s. Hostile to the republican reforms, and with many of its top echelon officers sympathizing with the far-right movements of Nazi Germany and Fascist Italy, part of the military elite staged a failed coup led by General Sanjurjo in 1934. However, the rebellion led by General Franco against the Spanish Republic in 1936 was more successful and marked the beginning of the Spanish Civil War.

While more than half of the aircraft of the Spanish Republican Air Force remained on the loyalist side, most of the material was obsolete. In the summer of 1936 the beleaguered Spanish Republic found itself direly in need of modern weapons, but the governments of the United Kingdom and France quickly led a policy of non-intervention in the Spanish Civil War. In defiance of the non-intervention pact some aircraft were sent to Republican Spain from France thanks to the efforts of personalities supporting the republican cause, but these consisted mostly in old material, including trainers, transport aircraft and planes without weapons that could not be used for attacks. Owing to the international blockade against the republic other planes of dubious value were acquired by the republican government through various sources, including Mexico, the Netherlands, Belgium and Czechoslovakia which included a motley combination of obsolete aircraft, prototypes and almost discarded single models. Some of the shipments of aircraft did not make it to the Spanish fronts owing to the sinking of the merchant vessels transporting them or having been seized by the customs at the ports of origin. The most well-known Spanish Republican Air Force planes such as the 'Chato', 'Mosca', 'Natacha' and 'Katiuska' would come later in the same year and throughout 1937, when the USSR would decide to openly assist the Spanish Republic.

Documents
Information, both written and pictorial, regarding the identification of the aircraft of the Spanish Republican Air Force is found in a variety of sources. These include press reports of the time, official republican government documents, as well as documents and reports from the rebel side.

Since republican aerodromes were restricted military areas, relatively few photographs are available. Most are pictures of aircraft taken with air force personnel posing near them in an informal way, as well as photographs of crashed planes. Except for the primary aircraft, certain republican military plane types were never photographed, or if available, photographs have not been found, being only known from written documents or from pilot reports. This is often the case in the assorted —often obsolete and almost useless— aircraft of which only one or two units arrived in the first critical months at the beginning of the civil war. There are also aircraft which had been known only from written documents, such as the Spanish Republican Air Force Farman F.430, of which a picture has surfaced only recently.

Attack aircraft

 Beechcraft Staggerwing
 Breguet XIX
 Gourdou-Leseurre GL.32
 Gourdou-Leseurre GL-633
 Grumman G-23, nicknamed 'Delfín'
 Hispano-Suiza E-30
 Potez 25
 Vickers Vildebeest

Bombers

 Bloch MB.200, photographic data are lacking 
 Bloch MB.210
 Breguet 413, 
 Breguet 460 Vultur
 Fokker F.IX
 Hawker Spanish Osprey
 Latecoere 28
 Macchi M.18
 Polikarpov R-5, also known as 'Rasante'
 Polikarpov R-Z, nicknamed 'Natacha'
 Potez 540
 Tupolev SB, nicknamed 'Katiuska'
 Vultee V-1

Fighters

 AEKKEA-RAAB R-29
 Avia BH-33
 Bristol Bulldog (1 only for evaluation)
 Blériot-SPAD S.51
 Blériot-SPAD S.91
 Boeing 281 (1 example only)
 Dewoitine D.27
 Dewoitine D.53
 Dewoitine D.372

 Dewoitine D.510
 Fokker D.XXI
 Hawker Hispano Fury
 Letov Š-31
 Letov Š-231
 Letov Š-331 (1 example only)
 Loire 46
 Martinsyde F.4 Buzzard
 Hispano-Nieuport Ni-52
 Polikarpov I-15, nicknamed 'Chato'
 Polikarpov I-16, nicknamed 'Mosca'

Patrol and liaison aircraft

 Caudron C.600 Aiglon
 de Havilland DH.83 Fox Moth
 Dornier Do J Wal
 Fokker C.X
 Lockheed Model 9 Orion
 Macchi M.18
 Miles Falcon
 Potez 58
 RWD 9
 Sikorsky S-38B, one unit was used in the Northern Front. Shot down by friendly fire
 Vickers Vildebeest

Reconnaissance

 Aero A.101
 Bellanca 28-70
 Caudron C.59
 Koolhoven F.K.51
 Loring R-3, may have seen active service, but data are lacking
 Savoia-Marchetti SM.62
 Seversky SEV-3
 Spartan Executive

Trainers

 Avia BH-33
 Avro 504, obsolete by 1936, but some Aeronáutica Naval Avros may have been used as trainers
 Avro 594
 Avro 626
 Avro 643 Cadet
 BFW M.35
 British Aircraft Swallow
 Bücker Bü 133 Jungmeister
 CASA III
 Caudron C.270 Luciole
 Comper Swift
 de Havilland DH.60 Moth Major
 de Havilland Tiger Moth
 Farman F.354
 Farman F.480 Alizé
 Focke-Wulf Fw 56
 General Aircraft Monospar ST-4
 General Aircraft Monospar ST-12
 González Gil-Pazó GP-1
 González Gil-Pazó GP-4
 Hanriot H.180
 Hanriot H.437
 Hispano-Suiza E-34
 Loring E-2
 Miles M.2 Hawk Trainer
 Morane-Saulnier MS.181
 Morane-Saulnier MS.230
 Morane-Saulnier MS.341
 Moreau JM.10 designer murdered while trying to sell single aircraft, use and fate unknown.
 Romano R.82
 Romano R.83
 Romano R.92
 S.F.C.A. Maillet 21
 SAB-SEMA 12
 Spartan Zeus, purchased but not delivered
 Stampe et Vertongen RSV.32

Transport aircraft

Many of the aircraft used for transport and liaison by the Republican Air Force had been requisitioned from LAPE, the Spanish Republican airline.

 Airspeed Envoy
 Airspeed Viceroy
 Avia 51
 Blériot 111
 Blériot-SPAD S.56
 Breguet 26T
 Breguet 470 Fulgur, from LAPE
 British Aircraft Eagle
 Caudron C.440 Goéland
 Consolidated Fleetster
 Couzinet 101
 De Havilland DH-80 Puss Moth
 De Havilland DH-84
 De Havilland DH-89M
 De Havilland DH-90
 Douglas DC-1
 Douglas DC-2
 Farman F.190
 Farman F 402
 Farman F.430
 Fokker F-VII.3m/M also used as a bomber in Asturias.
 Fokker F.XVIII
 Fokker F.XX
 Ford Trimotor
 General Aircraft ST-25, from LAPE
 General Aviation GA-43, from LAPE
 Junkers K 30
 Koolhoven F.K.40
 Latécoère 28
 Lioré et Olivier 213
 Lockheed Model 10 Electra
 Lockheed Model 8 Sirius
 Lockheed Vega
 Northrop Delta, from LAPE
 Northrop Gamma
 Potez 560 from LAPE

Autogyros
 Cierva C.19
 Cierva C.30A

Captured aircraft

Planes of the Nationalist Spanish Air Force that fell into the hands of the Republicans.  
Fiat CR.32, a number of these biplanes were captured and incorporated into the Republican Air Force. One of them was sent to the training facility at El Carmolí.
Heinkel He 111B-1,	one unit of the Condor Legion captured after a forced landing in Cuenca ended up being sent to the Soviet Union.
Messerschmitt Bf 109B, another Condor Legion plane that was captured intact near Bujaraloz, Aragon, also ended up being sent to the USSR.
Savoia-Marchetti SM.81A, a bomber of the Aviazione Legionaria, was incorporated into the Republican Air Force.

See also 
 List of Interwar military aircraft
 Spanish Republican Navy
 Yankee Squadron

Further reading 
 Gerald Howson, Aircraft of the Spanish Civil War, 1936-39,

References

External links

ADAR Asociación de Aviadores de la República
La ayuda material a la República
Spanish Civil War: Republican Air Force
AC - Hilo sobre las aviadoras y los aviadores del socialismo

Spanish Air and Space Force
Armed Forces of the Second Spanish Republic
Military history of Spain
Spain
Spanish military-related lists